Hans-Peter Obwaller (born 17 June 1971 in Saalfelden) is an Austrian former cyclist.

Major results

2001
 1st  National Hill Climb Championships
 1st Stage 5 Sachsen-Tour
 2nd Overall Tour of Austria
 3rd National Road Race Championships
2002
 1st  National Hill Climb Championships
 2nd Overall Tour of Austria
1st Stage 5
2003
 1st  National Hill Climb Championships
 3rd Overall Tour of Austria
2004
 1st  National Hill Climb Championships
 3rd National Time Trial Championships
2005
 1st  National Time Trial Championships
 3rd National Road Race Championships
2007
 2nd National Time Trial Championships
2008
 2nd National Road Race Championships

References

1971 births
Living people
Austrian male cyclists
People from Saalfelden
Sportspeople from Salzburg (state)
21st-century Austrian people